Anatoliy Mykolayovych Shepel (born on 12 December 1949) is a former Ukrainian football player.

Honours
 Soviet Top League winner: 1974, 1976 (spring)
 Soviet Cup winner: 1974.

International career
Shepel played his only game for the USSR on 20 May 1974 in a friendly against Czechoslovakia.

External links
  Profile

1949 births
Sportspeople from Kyiv
Living people
Soviet footballers
Soviet football managers
Ukrainian football managers
Association football forwards
Soviet Union international footballers
Ukrainian footballers
FC Polissya Zhytomyr players
FC Chornomorets Odesa players
FC Dynamo Kyiv players
FC Dynamo Moscow players
Soviet Top League players